This is a list of singles that charted in the top ten of the Billboard Argentina Hot 100 chart in 2021.

Top-ten singles
Key
 – indicates single's top 10 entry was also its Hot 100 debut

2020 peaks

2022 peaks

See also
 List of Billboard Argentina Hot 100 number-one singles of 2021

Notes 

Notes for re-entries

References

Argentina Hot 100 Top Ten Singles
Argentine record charts
Argentina 2021